Buick is an extinct town in southwest Iron County, in the U.S. state of Missouri. The GNIS classifies it as a populated place.

The town was located on Missouri Route KK, four miles southeast of Boss and 3.5 miles south of Bixby.

The area is the location of the Buick Mine, owned by the Doe Run Company.

A post office called Buick was established in 1918, and remained in operation until 1955. The community was named for the fact the first car owner in the area drove a Buick.

See also
Chevrolet, Kentucky

References

Ghost towns in Missouri
Former populated places in Iron County, Missouri